Telephones – main lines in use:
47,000 (1995)

Telephones – mobile cellular:
NA

Telephone system:
domestic:
fair open wire and microwave radio relay system
international:
satellite earth station – 1 Intelsat (Atlantic Ocean)

Radio stations:
AM 2, FM 14 (including 6 repeaters), shortwave 6 (including 5 repeaters) (1998)

Radios:
104,000 (1997)

Television stations:
3 (plus eight low-power repeaters) (1997)

Televisions:
30,000 (1997)

Internet Service Providers (ISPs):
NA

Country code (Top-level domain): GF

See also 
 French Guiana
 Telecommunications in France

External links 
 Interreg Caribbean
 French Guiana, SubmarineCableMap.com

French Guiana
French Guiana
 
+French Guiana